An obituary in the Brooklyn Daily Eagle, Brooklyn N.Y.  dated January 3, 1913 is headlined "General Edward M. Lee."  The first line reads; " General Edward Merwin Lee, who as Governor of Wyoming, signed the first bill giving women the ballot, died of paralysis at the private sanitarium 124th West 136th st, Manhattan on Wednesday" (which would have been January 1, 1913).   Edward Merwin Lee and Edward M. Lee are the same person. 

Edward Merwin Lee (23 August 1835 - 1 January 1913) was an attorney from Guilford, Connecticut, who went on to serve under General Custer during the American Civil War. While starting as a frontier attorney he quickly advanced to become Lieutenant Colonel of the 5th Michigan Cavalry, serving in Custer's Michigan Brigade (otherwise known as the "Wolverines").

Life

References

Union Army officers
1835 births
1913 deaths
19th-century American lawyers